On the Hill is an historic house at 982 Jefferson Street in Boydton, Virginia.  The oldest portions of the house were built as a farmhouse in the early 19th century.  In the late 19th century the Finch family hired a prominent local contractor, Jacob Holt, to transform the house into an elaborate Queen Anne residence.  It has a three-story turret, and a porch that extends across the whole width of the house.  The porch is decorated with bracketed eaves, and the house's main gable is decorated with carved woodwork.

The house was listed on the National Register of Historic Places in 2014; it is also a contributing element of the Boydton Historic District.

See also
National Register of Historic Places listings in Mecklenburg County, Virginia

References

Houses on the National Register of Historic Places in Virginia
Houses in Mecklenburg County, Virginia
National Register of Historic Places in Mecklenburg County, Virginia
Individually listed contributing properties to historic districts on the National Register in Virginia